The Iowa Street Historic District is located in Dodgeville, Wisconsin, United States.

Description
The district is made up of Dodgeville's old downtown, including the 1859 Greek Revival Iowa County Courthouse, the 1888 Italianate-styled Ford hardware store, the 1901 Queen Anne Auditorium (opera house), the 1919 Neoclassical-styled First National Bank, the 1922 Commercial Craftsman Pollard harness shop, and the 1940 Art Deco Commonwealth Telephone Company.

See also

 National Register of Historic Places listings in Iowa County, Wisconsin

References

External links

Historic districts on the National Register of Historic Places in Wisconsin
National Register of Historic Places in Iowa County, Wisconsin